The Rench Valley Railway (German: Renchtalbahn) is a 29.1 kilometre long branch line from Appenweier to Bad Griesbach (Schwarzwald), that mainly follows the valley of the River Rench in the Black Forest with maximum inclines of 1:99.

The first section between Appenweier and Oppenau was opened on 1 June 1876 by the Rench Valley Railway Company (Renchthal-Eisenbahn-Gesellschaft). It was taken over by the Grand Duchy of Baden State Railways on 31 May 1909, who had in any case operated the line from the outset. The Deutsche Reichsbahn extended the line on 28 November 1926 to Bad Peterstal and on 23 May 1933 to Bad Griesbach.

References

Railway lines in Baden-Württemberg
Ortenaukreis
Railway lines in the Black Forest